Katlin Mastandrea (born October 31, 1995) is an American actress best known for her recurring role as "Weird Ashley" Wyman on the ABC sitcom The Middle.

Early life
Katlin Mastandrea was born in Englewood, Colorado on October 31, 1995. At the age of two, she told her mother that she wanted to "make people laugh." After first working in Los Angeles at the age of 12, Katlin and her family moved to California permanently when she was 16-years-old so that she could pursue her career.

Career
As an actress, Mastandrea has played a number of television roles. After minor roles, Katlin gained critical acclaim in the role of Izzy in the short film Make Believer. For her performance, she was bestowed a Best Young Actress Performance in a Short Film award at the 32nd Young Artist Awards. That same year, Mastandrea had a role on the CBS drama Criminal Minds. Within a year, she was cast in the role of "Weird Ashley" for the ABC sitcom The Middle. as well as the recurring role of "Olivia" in the FX comedy Anger Management.

Recently, Mastandrea began work as a director, cinematographer and editor for a documentary entitled "From the Heartland." This documentary follows a year in the life of a coach and farmer in a small, rural community.

Filmography

References

External links
 

1995 births
21st-century American actresses
Actresses from Los Angeles
Actresses from Colorado
American child actresses
American film actresses
American people of Italian descent
American television actresses
Living people